Darlene Thomasina Pidgeon (born 1975) is a Canadian rock climber known for being one of the world's strongest female boulderers in the early 2000s and 2010s, was for a time the strongest female Canadian boulderer, and was the first Canadian female to climb the grades of V10, V11, and V12. She is often featured in Gripped Magazine and contributes to The Collective (a multi-climber website). She has also been featured in several international magazines and websites and her image has been used in advertising, magazine galleries, and magazine covers.

Thomasina is also a mother (her daughter Cedar travels around with her), a writer, a doula, sews and sells clothing, shopping bags, and other crafts, and works as a photographer.  She is one of 5 athletes to be featured in The Season 2, a 22 episode web TV show.

Beginnings
Pidgeon started climbing near Flatrock in her early 20s on a trip home to her native Newfoundland.  Soon after she moved to Whistler, British Columbia, and climbed occasionally at small local sport climbing areas like Nordic Rock and Rogue's Gallery while working several jobs with the goal of visiting Europe for an extended trip.  With the money she'd saved she got a working visa and went on a year-and-a-half long trip to Wales, Ireland, parts of Eastern Europe, and Morocco.  She learned to traditional climb in Wales, but most of the trip was spent visiting new places.  She returned to Canada, moved to Kelowna, and began studying sciences at Okanagan University College.  She continued climbing while in school and after a year and a half she moved to Vancouver to work and climb as much as possible.  She got a job at Mountain Equipment Co-op and began climbing at The Edge climbing gym in Vancouver.  She injured her shoulder, kept climbing on it, and eventually was unable to lift her arm above shoulder level.  After a year off of climbing her arm had not improved so she visited a physio-therapist and with the exercises he taught her she was able to strengthen her shoulder and climb again.  She began spending much of her time outside on the boulders at the base of the world-famous granite monolith "The Chief" in Squamish, BC.

Commitment
Pidgeon quickly became integrated into the Squamish climbing community and in 2001 she moved to Squamish, where she currently lives in a van, to live and climb as much as she possibly could.

Bouldering
In her first decade of climbing Pidgeon quickly became one of the most progressive female boulderers in the world, opening the doors to the harder grades by making First Female Ascents (FFAs, not to be confused with the traditional usage of FFA in climbing) of many double digit problems.

V10 - In 2001 Pidgeon made an ascent of Zero Zero in Squamish, BC.  The problem had previously been climbed by American climber Tiffany Campbell.  Pidgeon had only climbed a handful of harder moderates at the time and for a climber of her level, much less a female climber, to try a V10 was considered ridiculous.  Nevertheless, Pidgeon picked her project and after only a handful of days of effort she sent the problem.  It was one of the first female V10 ascents in the world and the first by a Canadian woman.  It was another year before Pidgeon began climbing V10 again, but that year was quite productive with ascents in Squamish, Hueco Tanks (Texas), Bishop (California), Little Cottonwood Canyon (Utah), and an area in Nova Scotia.  2004 saw two more ascents and 2005 one.  In 2006 Thomasina became pregnant with her daughter Cedar and did not begin climbing seriously again until 2008 when Cedar was old enough to travel.  That year Thomasina made four more V10 ascents.  Since then she has kept up the pace, sending several V10 and harder problems each year.  As of August 2011 she has sent over 40 V10s.

V11 - Pidgeon was the first Canadian woman and one of the first women in North America to climb V11.  As of August 2011 she has done over 20 V11s, almost all FFAs.  Her first was "The Egg" (FFA) in Squamish in 2008.  She quickly followed that ascent with Water Hazard (2nd ascent, FFA, Bishop), La Belette (FFA Bishop), Lucky Charms (FFA Squamish), and Beefy Gecko (Bishop), all in 2008.  In 2009 she managed "Encore En Fois" (Squamish), and in 2010 she went back on the road and did 8 more V11s, 7 of which were FFAs.  Perhaps most impressive was her FFA and 2nd try ascent of "The Hand" in Hueco.

V12 - Pidgeon was the first Canadian woman and one of the first women in North America to have climbed V12, and she for a long time was one of only a few female boulderers in the world to have climbed multiple V12 boulder problems.  As of 2011 she has climbed 7 V12s-- "The Butterpumper"  (FFA Hueco Tanks, February 2009), "Rumble in the Jungle" (Hueco Tanks, March 2009), "Barefoot on Sacred Ground" (FFA Hueco Tanks, January 2010), "Summoning Sit" (FFA Squamish, June 2010), "Sur Le Tois" (FFA, Squamish, September 2010), "Beautiful Gecko" (FFA since break, Bishop, March 2011), and "The Aquarium" (FFA Bishop, March 2011).  She has also done two slash grade (V11/12) problems -- "Sarah Sit" (Hueco Tanks, 2004), and "Chablanke" (Hueco Tanks, February 2010).

Routes

Sport
"Technical Ecstasy" (13b)
"Presto" (13a)
"Young Blood" (13a/b)

Trad
"The Grand Wall" (5.11+)
"The Daily Planet" (12a)

For a full list of Pidgeon's bouldering and route ascents search for her scorecard on climbing ranking site 8a.nu.

Competition highlights

Canada
2012 - Tour De bloc - Montreal - 2nd
2012 - Tour De Bloc - Ontario - 2nd
2009 - Tour De Bloc - Kelowna, British Columbia - 1st
2008 - November Sessions - Vancouver - 3rd
2007 - November Sessions - Vancouver - 1st
2007 - Rockfall - St. Johns, Newfoundland - 1st
2005 - Petzl Roc Trip  - Squamish - 2nd
2005 - Pebble Wrestle - Abbotsford, BC - 1st
2005 - Tour De Bloc - Richmond, BC - 1st
2004 - Crag X ABS6 Comp - Victoria, BC - 1st

International
2010 - Hueco Rock Rodeo - 2nd
2009 - Hueco Rock Rodeo - 1st
2006 - Boulder Fest - Australia - 1st
2006 - Boulder Fest Overall - Australia - 2nd
2005 - Seoul International Bouldering Competition - Korea - 4th
2004 - Seattle Bouldering Challenge - Seattle, USA - 2nd

Media

Magazines and Climbing News Sites: Print and Online

8a.nu (Online, Global)

Thomasina does Beautiful Gecko

Climbing Magazine (Print & Online, USA)

Beautiful Gecko Short Web Article

Dead Point Magazine (Print & Online, USA & Global)

Double-Digits Article
Women in Hueco Article

Gripped Magazine (Print, Canada)

Squamish and Motherhood

UK Climbing (Online, United Kingdom)

Girls climbing 8A

Urban Climber Magazine (Print & Online, USA)

Interview with Urban Climber
The X Factor Article
Mention in Female Crushing Article

Video Appearances
 Thomasina climbing Beautiful Gecko on Deadpoint Magazine
 Video including Thomasina climbing Barefoot on Sacred Ground
 The Season 2 
Climber in "Herman Hesse Memorial Hospital" commercial for US TV, 2008
http://www.vimeo.com/25092863

Featured climber in the Top 20 Boulder Classics of NA, N. Condor film, 2006
http://www.fanaticalfilms.com/top20_synopsis.htm

Books
Contributed to Quality Lesson Plans for Outdoor Education

Sponsors
La Sportiva 
Arc'teryx 
Vega 
Metolius

References

External links
 http://www.facebook.com/pages/Thomasina-Pidgeon/150943204990212
 http://www.8a.nu/?IncPage=http%3A//www.8a.nu/user/Profile.aspx%3FUserId%3D32071

Canadian rock climbers
Living people
1975 births
Sportspeople from Newfoundland and Labrador
Sportspeople from British Columbia